Terry Scully (13 May 1932 – 17 April 2001) was a British theatre and television actor.

After making his name in the theatre, from the 1960s onwards he became more known for TV work. In 1960 he starred in the BBC's production of An Age of Kings, playing King Henry VI in several episodes.

Other notable roles for Scully were as Horatio Nelson in the 1968 television series, Triton, and as Bicket in the BBC's 1967 blockbuster adaptation of The Forsyte Saga.  He also appeared in Dixon of Dock Green, Z-Cars, Softly, Softly, Callan, Public Eye, The Venturers, and Angels.

Like many actors of his generation, he is now probably best remembered for his roles in Cult TV series, due to their enduring appeal - even though they were no more notable, at the time, than his many other TV roles.  He appeared in the Doctor Who serial The Seeds of Death, the Blake's 7 episode "Dawn of the Gods" and starred as Vic Thatcher in four episodes of the 1970s series Survivors. During his time on that series, Scully suffered a nervous breakdown. As a result, his role was filled by actor Hugh Walters in subsequent episodes.

In 2001, Scully died of a stroke, aged 68.

References

External links
 

1932 births
2001 deaths
British male television actors
British male stage actors